is a football/soccer video game developed by Visco and edited by SNK in 1995 for the Neo-Geo console.

Gameplay 

The game represents a simplified football/soccer World cup, which consists of eliminating 7 teams to win the final victory. The first 3 are announced simulating a group stage prior to the direct elimination stage. The other 4, as part of that stage. In that second stage, all the classified selections are shown and which are advancing and which are staying along the way.

Each match lasts 2 minutes, stopping the time each time the ball is not in play, contrary to the official rules of this sport. When the clock reaches zero, there will be 12 extra seconds not shown on the screen, as injury time.

As in many football/soccer games that are not simulators, in case of draw is needed to continue with an additional credit, and then decide whether to repeat the game or opt for a penalty shootout.

Teams 
The game presents 28 national teams, which have 3 characteristics that differentiate them from each other, which are shown when choosing each one: Shooting, Defense and Speed. The countries represented are, in order of position on the selection screen:

 America refers to the United States, while Korea refers to South Korea.

Formations 
There are 6 types of formations to choose from, and the chosen one cannot be changed throughout the game. They appear as follows on the screen:

Development and release

Reception 

AllGames Kyle Knight gave an overall positive review of Goal! Goal! Goal!.

Notes

References

External links 
 Goal! Goal! Goal! at GameFAQs
 Goal! Goal! Goal! at Killer List of Videogames
 Goal! Goal! Goal! at MobyGames

1995 video games
Arcade video games
Arcade-only video games
Association football video games
Multiplayer and single-player video games
Neo Geo games
SNK games
Visco Corporation games
Video games developed in Japan